The Roman Catholic Church in Chile comprises five ecclesiastical provinces each headed by an archbishop. The provinces are in turn subdivided into 19 dioceses and 6 archdioceses each headed by a bishop or an archbishop. There is also one Territorial Prelature, one Apostolic Vicariate and one Military Ordinariate in Chile.  The bishops of Chile form the Episcopal Conference of Chile.

List of dioceses

Ecclesiastical province of Antofagasta
Archdiocese of Antofagasta (1881; diocese 1928; archdiocese 1967)
Diocese of Arica (1959; diocese 1986)
Diocese of Iquique (1880; diocese 1929)
Diocese of San Juan Bautista de Calama (1965; diocese 2010)

Ecclesiastical province of Concepción
Archdiocese of Concepción (1563; archdiocese 1939)
Diocese of Chillán (1916; diocese 1925)
Diocese of Santa María de Los Ángeles (1959)
Diocese of Temuco (1908; diocese 1925)
Diocese of Valdivia (1910; diocese 1944)
Diocese of Villarrica (1901; diocese 2001)

Ecclesiastical province of La Serena
Archdiocese of La Serena (1840; archdiocese 1939)
Diocese of Copiapó (1946; diocese 1957)
Territorial Prelature of Illapel (1960)

Ecclesiastical province of Puerto Montt
Archdiocese of Puerto Montt (1939; archdiocese 1963)
Diocese of Osorno (1955)
Diocese of Punta Arenas (1883; diocese 1947)
Diocese of San Carlos de Ancud (1840)

Ecclesiastical province of Santiago de Chile
Archdiocese of Santiago de Chile (1561; archdiocese 1840)
Diocese of Linares (1925)
Diocese of Melipilla (1991)
Diocese of Rancagua (1925)
Diocese of San Bernardo (1987)
Diocese of San Filipe (1925)
Diocese of Talca (1913; diocese 1925)
Diocese of Valparaíso (1872; diocese 1925)

Sui iuris Jurisdictions
 Military Ordinariate of Chile (bishopric 1910; ordinariate since 1986)
 Apostolic Vicariate of Aisén (1940)

References
Catholic-Hierarchy entry.
GCatholic.org.

Chile
Catholic dioceses